Sagnarelli  is a type of ribbon pasta originating in Abbruze. They are typically rectangular ribbons with fluted edges. It is typically served with a cream sauce and their sometimes uneven texture helps to hold thick sauces better.

References

Types of pasta